Julie Suedo (1901–1978) was a British actress. She played a succession of glamorous roles in the 1920s and 1930s, usually in supporting roles.

Filmography
One Arabian Night (1923)
The Rat (1925)
One Colombo Night (1926)
The Triumph of the Rat (1926)
One of the Best (1927)
The Fake (1927)
Two Little Drummer Boys (1928)
The Vortex (1928)
Victory (1928)
A Window in Piccadilly (1928)
Afterwards (1928)
The Physician (1928)
The White Sheik (1928)
Smashing Through (1929)
The Woman from China (1930)
Dangerous Seas (1931)
Paris Plane (1933)
Commissionaire (1933)
Love's Old Sweet Song (1933)
Nell Gwyn (1934)
Play Up the Band (1935)
Dream Doctor (1936)
Queen of Hearts (1936)
The Lilac Domino (1937)
Our Fighting Navy (1937)
The Life of Chopin (1938, short)
A Dream of Love (1938, short)
Georges Bizet, Composer of Carmen (1938, short)
Ireland's Border Line (1938)
The Dance of Death (1938)
If I Were Boss (1938)
On Velvet (1938)
The Villiers Diamond (1938)
Night Alone (1938)
The Dark Eyes of London (1939)
Saloon Bar (1940)
Kiss the Bride Goodbye (1945)

References

External links

1901 births
1978 deaths
British film actresses
English film actresses
English silent film actresses
Actresses from London
20th-century English actresses